Burt is a given name and also a shortened form of other names, such as Burton and Herbert, or a place name.

Burt may refer to:

People
Burt Alvord (1866–after 1910), American Old West lawman and outlaw
Burt Bacharach (1928–2023), American composer, music producer and pianist
Burt Baskin (1913–1967), co-founder of the Baskin-Robbins ice cream parlor chain
Burt Caesar, British actor, broadcaster and director 
Burt Grossman (born 1967), National Football League player
Burt Hooton (born 1950), American former Major League Baseball pitcher and coach
Burt Kennedy (1922–2001), American screenwriter and director
Burt Kwouk (born 1930–2016), English actor best known for playing Cato in the Pink Panther films
Burt Lancaster (1913–1994), American film actor
Burt Munro (1899–1978), New Zealand motorcycle racer
Burt Mustin (1884–1977), American character actor
Burt Reynolds (1936–2018), American actor and director
Burt Rutan (born 1943), American aerospace engineer
Burt Shevelove (1915–1982), American musical theater playwright, lyricist, librettist and director
Burt Shotton (1884–1962), American Major League Baseball player, manager, coach and scout
Burt L. Talcott (born 1920–2016), seven-term former member of the US House of Representatives from California
Burt Van Horn (1823–1896), two-term US Representative from New York
Burt Ward (born 1945), American actor best known for playing Robin on the TV show Batman
Burt Young (born 1940), stage name of American actor, painter and author Gerald Tommaso DeLouise

Fictional characters
Burt Chance from the TV series Raising Hope
Burt Fabelman, in the 2022 film The Fabelmans, based on director Steven Spielberg's father Arnold Spielberg.
Burt Gervasi from the TV show The Sopranos
Burt Gummer from the Tremors film series and short-lived TV show
Burt Hummel from the TV musical series Glee
Burt Weems, a character in the American sitcom television series The Hogan Family

See also
Bert (disambiguation)
Birt (disambiguation)

English-language masculine given names
Hypocorisms